The 1973 Taça de Portugal Final was the final match of the 1972–73 Taça de Portugal, the 33rd season of the Taça de Portugal, the premier Portuguese football cup competition organized by the Portuguese Football Federation (FPF). The match was played on 17 June 1973 at the Estádio Nacional in Oeiras, and opposed two Primeira Liga sides: Sporting CP and Vitória de Setúbal. Sporting CP defeated Vitória de Setúbal 3–2 to claim the Taça de Portugal for an eighth time.

Match

Details

References

1973
Taca
Sporting CP matches
Vitória F.C. matches